Nicolai Mandrîcenco (Mykola Mandrychenko; born 12 March 1958 in Plakhiyivka) is a Moldavian professional football manager and former footballer. He has Ukrainian citizenship.

Career
Since August 2014 he is the head coach of Moldavian football club FC Dinamo-Auto Tiraspol.

He has two sons Constantin Mandrîcenco and Dmitri Mandrîcenco both born in Moldova and who are also footballers.

See also
 Ivan Mandricenco

Notes

References

External links
 
 

1958 births
Living people
Ukrainian expatriates in Moldova
Soviet footballers
SC Odesa players
FC Elektrometalurh-NZF Nikopol players
FC Zimbru Chișinău players
FC Zimbru Chișinău managers
Moldovan football managers
Ukrainian football managers
FC Krasyliv managers
Association footballers not categorized by position
Moldovan Super Liga managers
FC Dinamo-Auto Tiraspol managers
Sportspeople from Odesa Oblast